Snowboarding at the 2019 European Youth Olympic Winter Festival was held from 11 to 14 February at Bjelašnica, Bosnia and Herzegovina.

Competition schedule
Sessions that included the event finals are shown in bold.

Notes
 Girls' slopestyle qualifications was postponed (weather conditions) from 11 to 12 February.

Medal summary

Medal table

Boys' events

Girls' events

References 

European Youth Olympic Winter Festival
2019
2019 European Youth Olympic Winter Festival events